Lorenzo Ranelli (born 5 June 1996) is an Italian footballer who plays as a midfielder for Italian Serie D club A.C. Carpi.

Club career 
Ranelli is a youth exponent from Frosinone. He made his Serie B debut on 22 May 2015 against Vicenza. He played the first 70 minutes of a 0-0 home draw before being substituted for Massimiliano Carlini.

On 11 August 2021 he joined to Serie D club Lornano Badesse Calcio. In July 2022, he joined A.C. Carpi.

References

External links

1996 births
Living people
People from Colleferro
Footballers from Lazio
Italian footballers
Association football defenders
Serie B players
Serie C players
Serie D players
Frosinone Calcio players
L'Aquila Calcio 1927 players
S.S.D. Città di Campobasso players
F.C. Legnago Salus players
A.C. Carpi players
Sportspeople from the Metropolitan City of Rome Capital